Panola County is a county located in the U.S. state of Texas. As of the 2020 census, its population was 22,491. The county seat is Carthage. Located in East Texas and originally developed for cotton plantations, the county's name is derived from a Choctaw word for cotton.

Until 2013, Panola County was one of about 30 entirely dry counties in Texas: the sale of alcohol was restricted or prohibited.

History

Jonathon Anderson, a migrant from the United States and founder of Panola County, donated about 500 acres of land in the 1800s to get the county started. Panola County was formed in 1846 from sections of Harrison and Shelby counties. Developed for cotton plantations, it was named after a Choctaw/Chickasaw word for cotton. In the antebellum years, planters used enslaved African Americans as workers on their large plantations. After the Civil War, freedmen worked largely as tenant farmers and sharecroppers in this area.

Geography

Major highways
  U.S. Highway 59
  Interstate 369 is currently under construction and will follow the current route of U.S. 59 in most places.
  U.S. Highway 79
  State Highway 43
  State Highway 149
  State Highway 315
  Farm to Market Road 10
  Farm to Market Road 31
  Farm to Market Road 124
  Farm to Market Road 1970

The TTC-69 component (recommended preferred) of the once-planned Trans-Texas Corridor went through Panola County.

Adjacent counties and parishes
 Harrison County (north)
 Caddo Parish, Louisiana (northeast)
 De Soto Parish, Louisiana (east)
 Shelby County (south)
 Rusk County (west)

Communities

Cities
 Beckville
 Carthage (county seat)
 Tatum (mostly in Rusk County)

Town
 Gary City

Unincorporated communities

 Grand Bluff
 Bethany (partly in Caddo Parish, LA)
 Clayton
 Corinth
 Deadwood
 DeBerry
 Galloway
 Long Branch
 Midyett
 Murvaul
 Panola
 Riderville

Ghost towns
 Center Point
 Mineral Springs

Demographics

Note: the US Census treats Hispanic/Latino as an ethnic category. This table excludes Latinos from the racial categories and assigns them to a separate category. Hispanics/Latinos can be of any race.

As of the census of 2000,  22,756 people, 8,821 households, and 6,395 families resided in the county.  The population density was 28 people per square mile (11/km2).  The 10,524 housing units averaged 13 per square mile (5/km2).  The racial makeup of the county was 78.78% White, 17.67% Black or African American, 0.36% Native American, 0.24% Asian, 1.87% from other races, and 1.07% from two or more races.  About 3.5% of the population were Hispanic or Latino of any race.

Of the 8,821 households, 32.00% had children under the age of 18 living with them, 57.90% were married couples living together, 11.30% had a female householder with no husband present, and 27.50% were not families; 25.10% of all households were made up of individuals, and 12.80% had someone living alone who was 65 years of age or older.  The average household size was 2.53 and the average family size was 3.02.

In the county, the population was distributed as 25.20% under the age of 18, 9.20% from 18 to 24, 25.10% from 25 to 44, 24.60% from 45 to 64, and 15.80% who were 65 years of age or older.  The median age was 39 years. For every 100 females, there were 92.30 males.  For every 100 females age 18 and over, there were 87.10 males.

The median income for a household in the county was $31,909, and for a family was $37,595. Males had a median income of $31,333 versus $19,017 for females. The per capita income for the county was $15,439.  About 11.60% of families and 14.10% of the population were below the poverty line, including 16.50% of those under age 18 and 16.10% of those age 65 or over.

Education
These school districts serve Panola County:
 Beckville ISD
 Carthage ISD
 Elysian Fields ISD (mostly in Harrison County)
 Gary ISD
 Joaquin ISD (mostly in Shelby County)
 Tatum ISD (mostly in Rusk County)
 Tenaha ISD (mostly in Shelby County)

Panola College, a junior college, has operated in Carthage since 1947.

Notable residents
 Tex Ritter, country music singer, born in Murvaul
 Jim Reeves, country music singer, born in Galloway

Points of Interest
 Texas Country Music Hall of Fame and Tex Ritter Museum is located in Carthage.

Politics

See also

 National Register of Historic Places listings in Panola County, Texas
 Recorded Texas Historic Landmarks in Panola County

References

External links
 Panola County government’s website
 
 Dry counties in Texas from the TABC

 
1846 establishments in Texas
Populated places established in 1846